The American Fork Historic District is a  historic district in 1850-founded American Fork, Utah, United States, that was listed on the National Register of Historic Places in 1998.

Description
The area has significance dating back to 1949. The boundaries are roughly 100 South between South 300 West and South 200 East along with parts of West Main Street, 200 West, South 100 West, South Center Street, and South 100 East. At listing the district included 104 contributing buildings. It includes Greek Revival, Late Victorian, and Late 19th and 20th Century Revivals architecture.

The district was deemed "locally significant, both architecturally and historically, because it represents the social, economic and architectural history of American Fork, Utah." Its architectural importance is for having intact examples of residences "built during the major construction periods in the town's history, from 1868-1940. The district accurately represents the wide range of architectural styles, types, and construction materials found in American Fork."

See also

 National Register of Historic Places listings in Utah County, Utah

References

External links

Greek Revival architecture in Utah
Historic districts in Utah County, Utah
Victorian architecture in Utah
American Fork, Utah
Historic districts on the National Register of Historic Places in Utah
National Register of Historic Places in Utah County, Utah
Buildings and structures in American Fork, Utah